General elections were held in San Marino on 10 June 1906.

Electoral system
The electoral law to was passed on 5 May by the Council elected in March. All householders and graduates over 25 years of age could vote. The republic was divided in nine multi-member constituencies according to their population; the City of San Marino had 22 seats, Serravalle had 12 seats, Faetano had 6 seats, Acquaviva, Chiesanuova, Domagnano and Montegiardino had 4 seats, and Fiorentino and San Giovanni had 2 seats

All councillors were elected in their constituency using a plurality-at-large voting.

Results
Elected candidates belonged to the liberal group which had supported the democratic action of the citizenry meeting or were members of the sole organised party, the Sammarinese Socialist Party, which claimed to have won 29 seats. These two factions formed the first democratic government of the country.

References

San Marino
General elections in San Marino
General election
Non-partisan elections
Sammarinese general election